A national football museum dedicated to Welsh association football in Wrexham has been proposed by various politicians in both the Welsh Government and local councils, with Wrexham County Borough Council being the leading contender for a museum due to Wrexham's football heritage. The museum is currently in the planning stages and under current proposals, the museum is set to be within the pre-existing County Buildings on Regent Street, in Wrexham's city centre, alongside the Wrexham County Borough Museum and Archives.

History 

In 2016, negotiations were underway between Plaid Cymru and the Welsh Labour government over a draft 2017–2018 Welsh Government budget, in which the two parties formed a majority of members in the Welsh Assembly. The draft budget included an additional £3 million in culture funding, which was awarded to the Arts Council of Wales, National Museum Wales, National Library of Wales and the Welsh Books Council, but also towards "feasibility studies for a national art gallery and a football museum in North Wales". By October 2017, for the 2018–2019 draft budget, £5 million was allocated towards the two feasibility studies.

In 2017, it was proposed that a National Football Museum be set up, with Wrexham claimed as the "spiritual home" of Welsh Football, and the leading contender for the museum.

Apart from the bid from Wrexham, the only other bid for the museum came from Powys County Council, which agreed to move forward with its bid in October 2017 to set up the museum in Newtown, Powys. The council stated they had a strong claim to the proposed museum, as they have available land for the project and Newtown A.F.C. was a founding member of the FAW, as well as the town being in the centre of Wales.

In November 2018, a Welsh Government feasibility study recommended a national football museum for Wales be set up in Wrexham, alongside other Welsh proposals of a national gallery of contemporary art. The estimated cost for the football museum was £4.4 million, which also involves redeveloping Wrexham Museum, with an annual running cost of £144,500 paid by the Welsh Government. Welsh footballer, Neville Southall, supported Wrexham as the museum's location.

Wrexham was chosen as the main contender for the football museum due to Wrexham's football heritage as the site of the founding of the Football Association of Wales in the Wynnstay Arms Hotel, Wales' oldest football club Wrexham A.F.C. founded in 1864 and its home in the oldest international stadium still in use, the Racecourse Ground. Wrexham Museum is already the custodian for the official Welsh Football Collection since 2000, the largest collection of Welsh football memorabilia with 2,000 items. To compare, there are 1,400 artefacts in the Welsh Sports Hall of Fame in Cardiff. Another reason stated by supporters of the proposal for Wrexham to host the museum was that the north-east of Wales does not host any "national museum" of Wales, with the others based in north-west, south-west and south-east Wales, specifically in Cardiff, Swansea, Torfaen, Gwynedd, Newport and Carmarthenshire. With Mid Wales having the national library based in Aberystwyth. The National Football Development Centre at Colliers Park, in Gresford near Wrexham was opened in 2019.

By May 2019, Dafydd Elis-Thomas, deputy Minister for Culture, Sport and Tourism in the Welsh Government announced Wrexham was the preferred option.

In July 2019, there were discussions over where the museum should be located in Wrexham. Wrexham council's Independent–Conservative executive board approved plans for the museum to be located within the same building as the existing County Borough Museum. Opposition councillors from Plaid Cymru and Labour proposed the museum should be housed in a re-developed Kop End stand of Wrexham A.F.C's Racecourse Ground. The council responded stating that an independent report by a consultancy firm recommended the museum be housed in the Wrexham Museum building, a recommendation backed by the government. Wrexham A.F.C. also said that they would prefer the museum not be housed in Kop End, so more parts of the redevelopment can go towards money raising facilities.

In December 2020, the plans were clarified to be "advancing" following initial stalling of the project, related to the COVID-19 pandemic in Wales. The council launched a formal tender process in the same month to select a designer of the project.

On 3 June 2021, Nick Jones was appointed as Football Museum officer, who previously worked at England's National Football Museum.

On 28 June 2021, a design team for the project was appointed with Haley Sharp Design, which includes Purcell as the architects and MDA Consulting as quantity surveyors. The team would collaborate with the Welsh Government and Wrexham Council to develop designs for the museum.

In July 2021, a football cap dating to 1899 was donated to the to be set up museum.

In November 2021, a public survey was opened for a limited time to local residents to receive local views on the proposals.

In June 2022, the project was awarded £45,000 by the National Lottery Heritage Fund.

Project details 
The project is funded by Wrexham County Borough Council and the Welsh Government and is currently underway to design and eventually open a national football museum in Wrexham. The project has been allocated £5 million in development funding by the government.

The museum is set to be based within the same building as Wrexham Museum, on Wrexham city centre's Regent Street. To accommodate the football museum, the building is set to undergo some "major refurbishment work", which would make use of the building's entire upper floor which is currently partly vacant.

The project is collaborating with staff from England's National Football Museum and the Scottish Football Museum. Wales, unlike Scotland and England, has not yet had a national football museum. The project forecasts there would be an increase of 80,000 in Wrexham city centre's annual footfall following the completion of the football museum. It is projected to open in 2024, with construction starting in 2022.

References

Association football museums and halls of fame
Museums in Wrexham County Borough
Proposed museums in the United Kingdom
Proposed buildings and structures in Wales